West Norristown Historic District is a national historic district located in Norristown, Montgomery County, Pennsylvania. It encompasses approximately 1,700 buildings in a primarily residential neighborhood in the West End of Norristown.  The housing predominantly consists of rowhouses with a large number of semi-detached houses.  The area was developed between 1885 and 1925 and the houses are in a variety of popular late-19th and early-20th-century architectural styles.

It was added to the National Register of Historic Places in 1984.

References

Historic districts on the National Register of Historic Places in Pennsylvania
Historic districts in Montgomery County, Pennsylvania
National Register of Historic Places in Montgomery County, Pennsylvania